Willis (or Wyllys) Buell (1790 – November 1851) was a native of Connecticut and third mayor of Atlanta. He was the first Justice of the Peace of the 1026th militia district and was said to be a talented portrait painter. He was a member of the Free and Rowdy Party.

Mayors of Atlanta
1790 births
1851 deaths
19th-century American politicians